Bill Brennan is a former sports journalist. A former columnist for The Detroit News, he won the Elmer Ferguson Memorial Award in 1987 and is a member of the media section of the Hockey Hall of Fame. He covered the Detroit Red Wings.

References

Living people
American male journalists
American sports journalists
American sportswriters
Elmer Ferguson Award winners
The Detroit News people
Year of birth missing (living people)